XII Stag (pronounced Twelve Stag), is a shoot 'em up arcade game developed by Triangle Service and published by Taito. Originally released for the Taito G-NET arcade board, and later ported to the PlayStation 2, Xbox 360, and PC.

Digital Bros published the port in Europe; however, the game was not released in the USA.

Gameplay

Attacks
Normal shot: Press A. There are 5 shot levels.
Barrier: Press B. Consumes 1 bomb.
Side attack LEVEL1: Tap horizontal direction once, then opposite direction.
Side attack LEVEL2: right, left, left or left, right, right
Back fire attack: When enemy is close to the rear of player's fighter, enemy is automatically damaged.

Multiplier system
When enemy is destroyed by Side attack or Back fire attack, the current score multiplier increases by 1, up to 12. The multiplier decreases by 1 at a time when enemy is not destroyed by either attack for a prolonged time period.

Releases

XIIstag Limited

It is a 1-stage demo of the game that includes Stage 4 of the original game. Full-screen and windowed executables are included. Unlike the original, the objects are 3d objects rendered in software.

XIIZEAL

XIIZEAL is a port of XII Stag released in 2007 for the Windows Mobile platform. It includes 5 difficulty settings from very easy to very hard, as well as the original soundtrack. This version was later released for Steam in 2015.

Shooting Love. 10 shuunen ~XIIZEAL & ΔZEAL~

The Xbox 360 version is a compilation version that includes XIIZeal and ΔZEAL.

DeltaZeal was originally as G-Stream G2020 by Oriental Soft, which was developed by future Triangle Service programmer and founder Toshiaki Fujino.

References

External links
XIIStag
Triangle service page
Triangle service XIISTAG LIMITED page
 Taito PS2 page
Taito history page
XIIStag strategy guide
NTSC-uk review

XIIZeal
Triangle Service page
XIIZeal site
Gamezanmai page

Shooting Love. 10 shuunen ~XIIZEAL & ΔZEAL~
Triangle Service page
Xbox Japan page
Shooting Love. 10 shuunen ~XIIZEAL & ΔZEAL~ strategy guide

2002 video games
2003 video games
2004 video games
2005 video games
2006 video games
2007 video games
Arcade video games
PlayStation 2 games
Video games developed in Japan
Windows games
Xbox 360 games
Multiplayer and single-player video games